William Capstick was an English footballer who played as a goalkeeper for South Kirkby, Sheffield Wednesday and Barnsley

Playing career
Capstick began his football career with South Kirkby, where he spent three seasons before joining Frickley Colliery in November 1928. He returned to South Kirkby for a short period where he was given a trial by an unnamed Cheshire League club, before yet again switching to Frickley in March 1931. In 1932 Capstick was signed by Barnsley, but moved to Mexborough Athletic in the same season. Next Capstick was plucked from Mexborough by Sheffield Wednesday but his time at the club was short, he returned to South Kirkby in February 1933.

References

English footballers
Association football goalkeepers
South Kirkby Colliery F.C. players
Sheffield Wednesday F.C. players
Barnsley F.C. players
Year of birth missing
Year of death missing